Norman Foster (19 January 1878 – 15 March 1960) was an Australian cricketer. He played in nine first-class matches for Queensland between 1898 and 1906.

See also
 List of Queensland first-class cricketers

References

External links
 

1878 births
1960 deaths
Australian cricketers
Queensland cricketers
Cricketers from Brisbane